Morgan High School is a public high school in McConnelsville, Ohio, United States. It is the only high school in the Morgan Local School District.

History

Morgan County was the first county in the United States to completely consolidate its various high schools into one school system.  Morgan County was also the first school district in the US to form a comprehensive curriculum consisting of general, college preparatory, and vocational education, all within one county.

The school is located near McConnelsville, Ohio, along the scenic banks of the Muskingum River.

The Morgan Local School District received matching funds in the Vocational Act of 1963.  These funds allowed the school officials to plan and create a new Trade and Industrial Vocational Program, comprising nine trades, to reside in its own building next to the proposed new high school, which opened in the fall of 1966.

With the new school came a new name and new colors for everyone in Morgan County.  The “Morgan Raiders” became Morgan's official team name. The school's new colors were silver-gray and blue as the dominant colors, with red and white as the secondary colors. The words to the alma mater and all school songs were selected by Gregory F. Trocchia, the school's music supervisor, and approved by the board of education.

In advance of the school's opening, the newly formed Morgan Raider Marching Band rehearsed twice weekly all summer. Performing several times in and around Morgan County prior to the new school's opening, the new band continued its efforts to raise funds for their new uniforms, first worn for an appearance before then President, L.B. Johnson in Lancaster, Ohio.

On October 1, 1966 nearly 2,000 people assembled for the outdoor dedication ceremony, while many more viewed the program via closed circuit television in various rooms inside the newly built school.

In the first school year, 1966–1967, there were 208 freshmen, 189 sophomore, 200 junior class members and 156 seniors enrolled.

The first yearbook annual was called the Morhi and the following year was renamed the Raider.

Events of interest
1966–1967 Morgan High School is the first comprehensive high school in the state of Ohio and first county consolidated comprehensive high school in the United States.

1966–1967 Vocational classes offered:  Electronics, Carpentry and Cabinet, Auto Mechanics, Business Education, Cosmetology, Homemakers Assistant, Vocational Machine Agriculture, Hydraulics and Pneumatics, Steno Clerk, General Office, and Distributive Education.

1967–1968	Carpentry built its first house.

1967–1968	Morgan Raider Band wins the Grand Championship at Bananza of Bands at Zanesville, Ohio.

References

External links
 District website

High schools in Morgan County, Ohio
School buildings completed in 1966
Public high schools in Ohio